Dr. O'Dowd is a 1940 British drama film directed by Herbert Mason, produced by Sam Sax for Warner Bros and starring Shaun Glenville, Peggy Cummins, Felix Aylmer and Irene Handl. Set in Ireland, it focuses on Marius O'Dowd, an Irish doctor, who works to restore his relationship with his son after his daughter-in-law dies under O'Dowd's care. The film was the onscreen debut for Peggy Cummins, who was only thirteen at the time. It was well received by critics, and Cummins' role was the subject of particular praise. The film is currently missing from the BFI National Archive, and is listed as one of the British Film Institute's "75 Most Wanted" lost films.

Plot
Marius O'Dowd (Shaun Glenville) is an Irish doctor who is often drunk. His daughter-in-law Moira (Pamela Wood) dies during a serious operation which O'Dowd is performing. Although O'Dowd is not to blame, his son Stephen (Liam Gaffney) suspects that Moira died due to O'Dowd operating while under the influence of alcohol, and accuses him of criminal neglect. O'Dowd consequently has his license to practice medicine taken away. Stephen also does not tell his daughter Pat (Peggy Cummins) that Marius is her grandfather, although several years later she becomes friends with Marius and works this out. Marius eventually manages to redeem himself by saving Stephen's life during an outbreak of diphtheria.

Cast
 Shaun Glenville – Marius O'Dowd
 Peggy Cummins – Pat O'Dowd
 Mary Merrall – Constantia
 Liam Gaffney – Stephen O'Dowd
 Patricia Roc – Rosemary
 James Carney – O'Hara
 Felix Aylmer – President
 Irene Handl – Sarah
 Walter Hudd – Doctor Crowther
 Pat Noonan – Mulvaney
 Maire O'Neill – Mrs Mulvaney
 Charles Victor – Dooley
 Pamela Wood – Moira

Production
Most of the filming for Dr. O'Dowd took place at the Warner Bros. studios in Teddington, with outdoor sequences shot in Cumberland in north west England and in County Wicklow, Ireland. The filming was undertaken in the summer of 1939, concluding just after the start of World War II. Warner Bros. employed a number of different experts as advisers to ensure the film was realistic, including a doctor, a nurse, an angler and a billiards player.

Dr. O'Dowd was the film debut for 13-year-old Peggy Cummins, who later starred in films such as Gun Crazy and The Night of the Demon. Cummins had caught the attention of film executives after appearing in a 1938 production named Let's Pretend in London, and this film was the beginning of a deal signed with Warner Bros. As part of an agreement with the London County Council, Cummins was limited to five house of filming per day and had to be supervised by a governess. The film was also a debut for her co-star Shaun Glenville, a music hall performer. This was only one of two film roles Glenville played in his career.

Release and reception
Dr. O'Dowd was distributed by the production studio Warner Bros. in 1940, with an initial trade showing in London on 16 January 1940. It had a public release in UK and Ireland in the same year. It was also distributed in America and Australia.

The film was received very positively by critics. One Irish newspaper described it as "one of the best films about Ireland ever made." Kinematograph Weekly summed up its positive response to the film as: "Good story, competent treatment, captivating juvenile angle, effective dramatic twists, good comedy and excellent atmosphere." In Australia, The Examiner described it as "one of the surprise hits of the year". Praise was particularly given to the two main actors, Shaun Glenville and Peggy Cummins. Despite the latter's young age, Kinematograph Weekly predicted that "Given the chance, she'll go far".

Halliwell's Film Guide describes it as a "somewhat woebegone tearjerker with an interesting cast".

The film is missing from the BFI National Archive, and is listed as one of the British Film Institute's "75 Most Wanted" lost films. No sequences of film are known to survive, although the BFI does possess a collection of stills from the production.

References

External links

 Dr. O'Dowd at BFI
 Dr. O'Dowd at AllMovie

1940 films
1940 drama films
1940 lost films
British drama films
1940s English-language films
Films directed by Herbert Mason
Lost British films
British black-and-white films
Lost drama films
1940s British films